Pocket protein family consists of three proteins:
 RB – Retinoblastoma protein
 p107 – Retinoblastoma-like protein 1
 p130 – Retinoblastoma-like protein 2

They play crucial roles in the metazoan cell cycle through interaction with members of the E2F transcription factors family.

References

Protein families